The 1958 Cork Intermediate Hurling Championship was the 49th staging of the Cork Intermediate Hurling Championship since its establishment by the Cork County Board in 1909.

Glen Rovers won the championship following a 5-09 to 3-06 defeat of Carrigaline in the final. This was their fifth championship title overall and their third title in succession.

References

Cork Intermediate Hurling Championship
Cork Intermediate Hurling Championship